Echium creticum, the Cretan viper's bugloss, (syn. Echium calycinum Viv., Echium rubrum Moench, Echium sericeum Vahl, Echium violaceum L.) is a species of flowering plant in the family Boraginaceae. It is native to the western Mediterranean Basin. It is also used as an ornamental plant.

References

External links
Echium  creticum
 Echium  creticum

creticum
Plants described in 1753
Taxa named by Carl Linnaeus